1824 Haworth is an asteroid from the outer region of the asteroid belt, approximately 14 kilometers in diameter. It was discovered on 30 March 1952, by Indiana University's Indiana Asteroid Program at its Goethe Link Observatory near Brooklyn, Indiana, United States, and named after physicist Leland John Haworth.

Orbit and classification 

Haworth orbits the Sun in the outer main-belt at a distance of 2.8–3.0 AU once every 4 years and 11 months (1,789 days). Its orbit has an eccentricity of 0.04 and an inclination of 2° with respect to the ecliptic.

Its first precovery was taken at Lowell Observatory in 1906, extending the body's observation arc by 46 years prior to its official discovery observation at Goethe Link.

Naming 

It was named in honor of American particle physicist Leland John Haworth (1904–1979), a graduate of Indiana University and second director of the National Science Foundation.

His long and varied career included teaching and serving as member of the Atomic Energy Commission, as vice-president and president of Associated Universities, Inc., and as director of the Brookhaven National Laboratory. His negotiations were instrumental for the funding of a 4-meter telescope at the Cerro Tololo Interamerican Observatory. The official  was published by the Minor Planet Center on 18 April 1977.

Physical characteristics 

According to the survey carried out by NASA's Wide-field Infrared Survey Explorer with its subsequent NEOWISE mission, Haworth measures 14.17 kilometers in diameter and its surface has an albedo of 0.266. As of 2017, its composition, rotation period and shape remain unknown.

References

External links 
 Asteroid Lightcurve Database (LCDB), query form (info )
 Dictionary of Minor Planet Names, Google books
 Asteroids and comets rotation curves, CdR – Observatoire de Genève, Raoul Behrend
 Discovery Circumstances: Numbered Minor Planets (1)-(5000) – Minor Planet Center
 
 

001824
001824
Named minor planets
19520330